In Roman mythology, Fraus was the goddess or personification of treachery and fraud.

She was daughter of Orcus and Night (Nyx).  She was depicted with a woman's face, the body of a snake, and on her tail the sting of a scorpion.

Fraus is an alternative name for Mercury,  the god of theft (among other things). She is alternatively described as Mercury's helper.. Her Greek equivalent was Apate.

References

Roman goddesses
Trickster goddesses
Children of Nyx